Melvin Lee "Kip" Holden (born August 12, 1952), is an American politician who served from 2005 to 2016 as the Democratic Mayor-President of Baton Rouge and East Baton Rouge Parish, Louisiana. The parish includes the state capital of Baton Rouge and smaller suburban cities such as Baker, Central City, and Zachary.

He was the unsuccessful Democratic candidate in the November 21, 2015 race for lieutenant governor. Victory went to the Republican Billy Nungesser.

He vacated his position as Mayor-President at the end of 2016 and was succeeded by Sharon Weston Broome, another member of the Democratic Party.

Early life and education
He studied at Louisiana State University in Baton Rouge, where he graduated Bachelor of Arts in Journalism in 1974. He then studied at Southern University in Baton Rouge where he graduated Master of Arts in Journalism in 1982. He then went to Southern University Law Center in Baton Rouge where he graduated a Juris Doctor in 1985.

Early career
Previous to his political career, Holden was a journalist and later an attorney.

He also worked at the Louisiana Department of Labor as a clerk in the Workers' Compensation Office, at the Baton Rouge City Police as a public information officer, and at the United States Census Bureau as a public relations specialist. He also worked at WXOK Radio in Port Allen as a news director (in 1975 and 1977), at  WWL Radio in New Orleans as a Reporter (in 1977 and 1978), and at WBRZ Channel 2, Baton Rouge as a Reporter (in 1978 and 1979).

Since 1991 he has been an  adjunct professor of law at Southern University Law Center - Baton Rouge.

He was a Member of the Baton Rouge Metro Council from District 2 from 1984 until 1988. He represented Louisiana State Representative from District 63 from 1988 until 2002. He served as Louisiana State Senator from District 15 from 2002 until 2004

He ran unsuccessfully for mayor-president of Baton Rouge in 1996 and 2000.

Mayoralty

2004 election

Holden was elected mayor-president on November 3, 2004, when he unseated the Republican incumbent, Bobby Simpson of Baker. Holden was inaugurated on January 3, 2005.

The 2004 race was Holden's third attempt to win the mayor-presidency. In 1996, he had failed in a bid to unseat Democrat-turned-Republican Mayor-President Tom Ed McHugh of Zachary, later the executive director of the Louisiana Municipal Association.

Holden's election as the first African-American Mayor-President of East Baton Rouge Parish was fostered through the support of his urban black base but also with substantial support from suburban whites, many being Republicans. Support from the latter group was buoyed by backing from Jim Bernhard, CEO of The Shaw Group, and several other figures in business and industry. The dissatisfaction with Mayor-President Simpson was demonstrated in dramatic fashion by the fact that President Bush received 54 percent of the parish vote in his re-election campaign, and then U.S. Representative Richard Hugh Baker received 69 percent. In the same election Holden matched Bush's 54 percent parishwide total.

First term
On taking office, Holden retained Walter Monsour, a Republican lawyer originally from Shreveport, as the chief administrative officer, even though Monsour had supported Simpson's reelection. Monsour told Holden that he would take the position if Holden agreed to treat all areas of the parish equally whether or not those precincts voted for Holden. Monsour had held the same post twenty years earlier in 1985 under then Democratic Mayor-President Pat Screen and was credited with resolving fiscal problems that developed in Screen's second term. Early in  2009, Monsour stepped down as CAO and was replaced by his assistant, former Republican State Representative Mike Futrell, a native of Baton Rouge. In 2012, Holden tapped a former mayoral rival from 2004, William Daniel, as the chief administrative officer, a position which Daniel still holds. Daniel is a petroleum engineer and a former state representative for District 68 in East Baton Rouge Parish.

Holden became a member of the Mayors Against Illegal Guns Coalition, an organization formed in 2006 and co-chaired by Mayors Michael Bloomberg of New York City and Thomas Menino of Boston, Massachusetts.

In 2008, Holden was inducted into the Louisiana Political Museum and Hall of Fame in Winnfield.

2008 reelection

In 2008, Holden was elected with 71% of the vote.

Second term

2012 reelection

Holden handily won reelection in the nonpartisan blanket primary held in conjunction with the national election on November 6, 2012. One of his opponents, Republican J. Michael "Mike" Walker Sr., a member of the Metro Council, questioned Holden and the city-parish for having provided security services for Louis Farrakhan when the Nation of Islam spokesman addressed a group on October 3 at Southern University. Walker's advertisement includes a video of Farrakhan thanking Holden and the police chief for security services and Farrakhan's escort to Baton Rouge from the airport in New Orleans.

With 115,305 votes (60 percent), Holden defeated three opponents. Walker finished second with 65,972 ballots (34.3 percent). Two Independents held the remaining 5.7 percent of the vote.

Third term

Efforts at higher office

2015 lieutenant gubernatorial campaign

In August 2014, Holden announced that he was seeking the position of lieutenant governor in 2015, as the incumbent Republican Jay Dardenne, also of Baton Rouge, challenged U.S. Senator David Vitter for the right to succeed the term-limited Republican Governor Bobby Jindal as well as the front-running Democratic candidate John Bel Edwards. Holden's opponents included three Republicans: State Senator Elbert Guillory of St. Landry Parish, who spoke out against the unsuccessful re-election bid of U.S. Senator Mary Landrieu in the 2014 election; John Young, president of Jefferson Parish; and Billy Nungesser, the former president of Plaquemines Parish and former candidate for lieutenant governor in 2011. The position is focused upon the promotion of tourism in Louisiana.

Holden led the four-candidate field in the primary with 360,679 votes (33.3 percent), qualifying him to face Nungesser in a runoff, who finished second in the primary with 324,654 votes (30 percent). In a strong third-place was John Young, who polled 313,183 votes (28.9 percent). Departing State Senator Elbert Guillory ran last with 85,460 votes (7.9 percent).
In the second round of balloting, Nungesser finished with 628,864 votes (55.4 percent) to Holden's 506,578 (44.6 percent). Holden nevertheless was an easy winner in populous Orleans and East Baton Rouge parishes.

2016 congressional campaign

In 2016, Holden, who was term-limited as Mayor-President in Baton Rouge, ran unsuccessfully for the U.S. House to represent Louisiana's 2nd congressional district held by fellow Democrat Cedric Richmond. The district has long been based in New Orleans, but had been redrawn after the 2010 census to include a slice of western Baton Rouge, including most of the capital's black precincts.

Holden finished with only 20 percent of the ballots cast to Richmond's 70 percent. Sharon Weston Broome, who had succeeded Holden in the state Senate, also succeeded him as Mayor-President after her 52-48 percent victory over Republican state Senator Bodi White in the runoff election held on December 10, 2016.

Personal life
Holden is one of five children, two deceased, of the late Mr. and Mrs. Curtis Lee Holden Sr. He has two sisters, Evelyn and Brenda Holden. His older brother, Curtis Holden Jr. (1950–2013), a native of Woodville, Mississippi, was a retired employee of the Baton Rouge municipal public works department. Prior to his death from complications resulting from two strokes, Curtis Holden Jr., had operated Holden's Powerhouse, a family-owned bar in the Scotlandville neighborhood of Baton Rouge.

Married to the former Lois Stevenson, Holden has five children, Melvin, II, Monique, Angela, Myron, and Brian-Micheal.

Notes

References

External links 
 Office of the Mayor-President
 ‘Kip’ Holden Celebrates at Greek Festival 2014

|-

|-

1952 births
African-American mayors in Louisiana
African-American state legislators in Louisiana
Journalists from Louisiana
Living people
Louisiana city council members
Louisiana Democrats
Louisiana lawyers
Louisiana state senators
Louisiana State University alumni
Mayors of Baton Rouge, Louisiana
Members of the Louisiana House of Representatives
Southern University Law Center alumni
21st-century American politicians
21st-century African-American politicians
20th-century African-American people